The Lutheran Church has, from the time of the Reformation, continued the remembrance of saints. The theological basis for this remembrance may be best illustrated in the words of the Epistle to the Hebrews: "Seeing we also are compassed about with so great a cloud of witnesses, let us lay aside every weight, and the sin which doth so easily beset us, and let us run with patience the race that is set before us." The Apology of the Augsburg Confession states that the remembrance of the saints has three parts: "The first is thanksgiving. For we ought to give thanks to God because He has shown examples of mercy; because He has shown that He wishes to save men; because He has given teachers or other gifts to the Church. And these gifts, as they are the greatest, should be amplified, and the saints themselves should be praised, who have faithfully used these gifts, just as Christ praises faithful business-men (Matt. 25:21, 23). The second service is the strengthening of our faith; when we see the denial forgiven Peter, we also are encouraged to believe the more that grace truly superabounds over sin (Rom. 5:20). The third honor is the imitation, first, of faith, then of the other virtues, which every one should imitate according to his calling."

As a result, the Lutheran reformers retained a robust calendar of saints to be commemorated throughout the year. In addition to the saints found in Holy Scripture, such saints as Saint Lawrence and Saint Martin of Tours were retained on the calendar, as were even extra-Biblical commemorations like the Assumption of Mary. Following the Reformation, most especially in the latter half of the twentieth century, many names were added to the calendar, both new and restored pre-Reformation commemorations.

The Calendar found below is a listing which aims to give a sense of the primary annual festivals and events that are celebrated liturgically by various Lutheran Churches in the English-speaking world. The calendars of the Lutheran Church–Missouri Synod (LCMS) and the Evangelical Lutheran Church in America (ELCA) in their present forms are listed below, as found in the 2006 Lutheran Service Book of the LCMS, and the 2006 Evangelical Lutheran Worship of the ELCA. In addition to these, some historic observances not currently found on the aforementioned calendars but appearing in earlier Lutheran uses are also provided.

While extensive, the Lutheran sanctoral calendar is not presently as strictly ranked as that of the Roman Catholic Church. Principal festivals are marked with BOLD CAPS and lesser festivals with bold text. If applicable, the country where a particular observed is also noted, if it is not commonly observed on that date in North America.  For individuals, the date given is generally the date of their death or "heavenly birthday."  The liturgical color for vestments and paraments is noted as follows: White (W), Red (R) or Violet (V). Commemorations specific to the LCMS, ELCA, or an earlier source are noted following each entry. Commemorations and festivals held in common are not annotated.

January

1 Circumcision and Name of Jesus (LCMS) Name of Jesus (ELCA) (W)
2 Johann Konrad Wilhelm Löhe, pastor, renewer of the church, 1872 (W)
3
4
5
6 THE EPIPHANY OF OUR LORD (W)
7
8
9
10 St. Basil the Great, Bishop of Caesarea, 379; Gregory of Nazianzus, Bishop of Constantinople, c. 389; Gregory, Bishop of Nyssa, c. 385 (Commemoration) W – LCMS
11
12
13 Octave of the Epiphany - The Baptism of Our Lord (W) - historic, now commonly observed on the Sunday within the Octave of the Epiphany
14 Eivind Berggrav,  Norwegian Lutheran bishop (Commemoration) W - ELCA
15 Martin Luther King Jr., renewer of society, martyr, 1968 (Commemoration) R – ELCA
16
17 Anthony of Egypt, renewer of the church, c. 356 (Commemoration) W – ELCA
 Pachomius, renewer of the church, 346 (Commemoration) W – ELCA
18 Confession of Peter (W)
Week of Prayer for Christian Unity Begins - ELCA
19 Henry, Bishop of Uppsala, missionary to Finland, martyr, 1156 (Commemoration) R – ELCA
20 Sebastian, Martyr (R) - Historic
Sarah, matriarch (Commemoration) W – LCMS
21 Agnes, Virgin and Martyr (R)
22
23
24 Saint Timothy, pastor (Lesser Festival) W - LCMS
25 Conversion of Paul the Apostle (W)
Week of Prayer for Christian Unity Ends - ELCA
26 Timothy, Titus, and Silas, missionaries (Commemoration) W – ELCA
Saint Titus, pastor (Lesser Festival) W - LCMS
27 John Chrysostom, Bishop of Constantinople, 407 (W) – LCMS
Lydia, Dorcas, and Phoebe, witnesses to the faith (Commemoration) W – ELCA

28 Thomas Aquinas, teacher, 1274 (Commemoration) W – ELCA
29
30
31

February
1
2 Presentation of our Lord (W)
3 Ansgar, Archbishop of Hamburg, missionary to Denmark and Sweden, 865 (Commemoration) W – ELCA
4
5 The Martyrs of Japan, 1597 (Commemoration) R – ELCA
 Jacob, patriarch (Commemoration) W – LCMS
6
7
8
9
10 Silas, apostle (Commemoration) W – LCMS
11
12
13 Aquila, Priscilla, and Apollos  (Commemoration) W – LCMS

14 Cyril, monk, 869; Methodius, bishop, 885; missionaries to the Slavs (Commemoration) W – ELCA
Valentine, martyr, 270 (Commemoration) R – LCMS
15 Philemon and Onesimus (Commemoration) W – LCMS
16 Philipp Melanchthon, confessor, 1560 (Commemoration) R – LCMS
17
18 Martin Luther, doctor and confessor, renewer of the church, 1546 (Commemoration) W
19
20
21
22
23 Polycarp, Bishop of Smyrna, martyr 156 (Commemoration) R
24 Matthias, Apostle (R) – LCMS (25th February in leap years)
25 Elizabeth Fedde, deaconess, 1921 (Commemoration) W – ELCA
26
27
28
29

March

1 George Herbert, priest, hymnwriter, 1633 (Commemoration) W – ELCA
2 John Wesley, 1791; Charles Wesley, 1788; priests, renewers of the church (Commemoration) W – ELCA
3
4
5
6
7 Perpetua and Felicity and companions, martyrs at Carthage, 202 (R)
8
9
10 Harriet Tubman, 1913; Sojourner Truth, 1883; renewers of society (Commemoration) W – ELCA
11
12 Gregory the Great, Bishop of Rome, 604 (W)
13
14
15

16
17 Patrick, bishop, missionary to Ireland, 461 (Commemoration) W
18
19 Joseph, Guardian of Jesus (W)
20
21 Thomas Cranmer, Archbishop of Canterbury, martyr, 1556 (Commemoration) R – ELCA
22 Jonathan Edwards, teacher, missionary to American Indians, 1758 (Commemoration) W - ELCA
23
24 Oscar Arnulfo Romero, Bishop of El Salvador, martyr, 1980 (Commemoration) R – ELCA
25 Annunciation of Our Lord (W)
26
27
28
29 Hans Nielsen Hauge, renewer of the church, 1824 (Commemoration) W – ELCA
30
31 John Donne, priest, poet,  1631 (Commemoration) W – ELCA
 Joseph, patriarch (Commemoration) W – LCMS

April

1 Amalie Sieveking, philanthropist and social activist – (Germany)
2
3
4 Benedict the African, confessor, 1589 (Commemoration) W – ELCA
5
6 Albrecht Dürer, 1528; Lucas Cranach, 1553; artists  (Commemoration) W
 Matthias Grünewald, artist, 1529 (Commemoration) W – ELCA
 Michelangelo, artist, (Commemoration) W – LCMS
7
8
9 Dietrich Bonhoeffer, theologian, martyr, 1945 (Commemoration) W – ELCA
10 Mikael Agricola, Bishop of Turku, 1557 (Commemoration) W – ELCA
11
12
13
14
15
16
17
18
19 Olaus Petri, priest, 1552; Laurentius Petri, Archbishop of Uppsala, 1573; renewers of the church (Commemoration) W – ELCA
20 Johannes Bugenhagen, pastor, 1558 (Commemoration) – LCMS
21 Anselm, Archbishop of Canterbury, theologian, 1109 (Commemoration) W

22 Day of Creation [Earth Day] (Lesser Festival) W – ELCA
23 Toyohiko Kagawa, renewer of society, 1960 (Commemoration) W - ELCA
24 Johann Walter, musician, 1570 (Commemoration) W – LCMS
25 Mark, Evangelist (R)
26
27
28
29 Catherine of Siena, theologian, 1380 (Commemoration) W – ELCA
30

May
1 Philip and James, Apostles (R)
2 Athanasius, Bishop of Alexandria, 373 (Commemoration) W
3 
4 Monica, mother of Augustine, 387 (Commemoration) W – ELCA
Friedrich Wyneken, pastor, missionary, 1864 (Commemoration) W – LCMS
5 Frederick the Wise, Christian ruler, 1525 (Commemoration) W – LCMS
6
7 Carl F. W. Walther, pastor, theologian, 1887 (Commemoration) W – LCMS
8 Julian of Norwich, renewer of the Church, c. 1416 (Commemoration) W – ELCA
9 Nicolaus Ludwig von Zinzendorf, renewer of the church, hymnwriter, 1760 (Commemoration) W – ELCA
 Job, patriarch (Commemoration) W – LCMS

10
11 Cyril, 869 and Methodius, 885, missionaries to the Slavs (Commemoration) W – LCMS
12
13
14 Matthias, apostle (Lesser Festival) R – ELCA
15
16
17
18 Erik, King of Sweden, martyr, 1160 (Commemoration) R – ELCA
19
20
21 Helena, mother of Constantine, c. 330 (W)
 Emperor Constantine, Emperor of Rome, 337 (Commemoration) W – LCMS
22
23
24 Nicolaus Copernicus, 1543; Leonhard Euler, 1783; scientists (Commemoration) W – ELCA
 Esther, matriarch, (Commemoration) W – LCMS
25 Bede, theologian, 735 (Commemoration) R – LCMS
26
27 John Calvin, renewer of the church, 1564 (Commemoration) W – ELCA
28
29 Juraj Tranovský, hymnwriter, 1637 (Commemoration) W – ELCA
30
31 Visit of Mary to Elizabeth -- minor festival (W) - modern date

June
1 Justin, martyr at Rome, c. 165 (Commemoration) R
2
3 Martyrs of Uganda, 1886 (Commemoration) R – ELCA
 John XXIII, Bishop of Rome, 1963 (Commemoration) W – ELCA
4 
5 Boniface, Archbishop of Mainz, missionary to Germany, martyr, 754 (Commemoration) R
6
7 Seattle, chief of the Duwamish Confederacy, 1866 (Commemoration) W – ELCA
8
9 Columba, 597; Aidan, 651; Bede, 735; teachers, renewers of the church (Commemoration) W – ELCA
10
11 Barnabas, Apostle (R)
12 First Ecumenical Council, 325 (Commemoration) W – LCMS
13
14 Basil the Great, Bishop of Caesarea, 379; Gregory of Nazianzus, Bishop of Constantinople, c. 389; Gregory, Bishop of Nyssa, c. 385 (Commemoration) W – ELCA
 Macrina, theologian, c. 379 (Commemoration) W – ELCA
 Elisha, prophet (Commemoration) R – LCMS
15

16
17
18
19
20
21 Onesimos Nesib, translator, evangelist, 1931 (Commemoration) W – ELCA
22
23
24 John the Baptist (W)
25 Presentation of the Augsburg Confession, 1530 (Commemoration) W
 Philipp Melanchthon, renewer of the church, 1560 (Commemoration) W – ELCA
26 John and Paul, Martyrs - LCMS
 Jeremiah, prophet (Commemoration) R – LCMS
27 Cyril, Bishop of Alexandria, 444 (Commemoration) W
28 Irenaeus, Bishop of Lyons, c. 202 (Commemoration) W
29 Peter and Paul, Apostles (R)
30 Commemoration of Paul the Apostle (R) - Historic

July

1 Catherine Winkworth, 1878; John Mason Neale, 1866; hymn translators (Commemoration) W – ELCA
2 
3 Thomas, apostle (Lesser Festival) R – ELCA
4
5
6 Jan Hus, martyr, 1415 (Commemoration) R – ELCA
 Isaiah, prophet (Commemoration) R – LCMS
7
8
9
10
11 Benedict of Nursia, Abbot of Monte Cassino, c. 540 (Commemoration) W – ELCA
12 Nathan Söderblom, Archbishop of Uppsala, 1931 (Commemoration) W – ELCA
13
14
15 The Division of the Holy Apostles (R) - Historic
16 Ruth, matriarch (Commemoration) W – LCMS
17 Bartolomé de Las Casas, missionary to the Indies, 1566 (Commemoration) W – ELCA
18 
19

20 Elijah, prophet (Commemoration) R – LCMS
21 Ezekiel, prophet (Commemoration) R – LCMS
22 Mary Magdalene, (W)
23 Birgitta of Sweden, renewer of the church, 1373 (Commemoration) W – ELCA
24
25 James, Apostle (R)
26 
27
28 Johann Sebastian Bach, 1750 W
 Heinrich Schütz, 1672; George Frederick Handel, 1759; musicians (Commemoration) W – ELCA
29 Saint Martha, Virgin (W)
Mary, Martha, and Lazarus of Bethany (Commemoration) W
Olaf, King of Norway, martyr, 1030 (Commemoration) R – ELCA
30 Robert Barnes (martyr), confessor and martyr (Commemoration) R – LCMS
31 Joseph of Arimathea (Commemoration) W – LCMS

August

1
2
3 Joanna, Mary, and Salome, myrrh-bearing women (Commemoration) W – LCMS
4
5
6 Transfiguration of Our Lord (W) - More commonly observed on the last Sunday after Epiphany
7
8 Dominic, priest, founder of the Order of Preachers (Dominicans), 1221 (Commemoration) W – ELCA
9
10 Lawrence, deacon, martyr 258 (Commemoration) R
11 Clare, Abbess of San Damiano, renewer of the Church, 1253 (Commemoration) W – ELCA
12
13 Florence Nightingale, 1910; Clara Maass, 1901; renewers of society (Commemoration) W – ELCA
14 Maximilian Kolbe, 1941; Kaj Munk, 1944; martyrs (Commemoration) R – ELCA
15 Assumption of Mary (W) (modern:Mary, Mother of Our Lord)<

16 Isaac, patriarch (Commemoration) W – LCMS
17 Johann Gerhard, theologian, 1637 (Commemoration) W – LCMS
18
19 Bernard, Abbot of Clairvaux, hymnwriter, theologian 1153 (Commemoration) W – LCMS
20 Bernard, Abbot of Clairvaux, hymnwriter, theologian, 1153 (Commemoration) W – ELCA
 Samuel, prophet (Commemoration) R – LCMS
21
22
23
24 Bartholomew, Apostle (R)
25
26
27 Monica, mother of Augustine 387 (Commemoration) W – LCMS
28 Augustine, Bishop and Doctor, 430 (W)
Moses the Black, monk, martyr, c. 400 (Commemoration) R - ELCA
29 The Martyrdom of John the Baptist (R) – LCMS
30
31

September
1 Joshua, prophet (Commemoration) R – LCMS
2 Nikolai Frederik Severin Grundtvig, bishop, renewer of the church, 1872 (Commemoration) W – ELCA
 Hannah, matriarch (Commemoration) W – LCMS
3 Gregory the Great, Bishop of Rome, 604 (Commemoration) W – LCMS
4 Moses, prophet (Commemoration)) R – LCMS
5 Zechariah, prophet
Elizabeth, matriarch (Commemoration) W – LCMS
6
7
8 Nativity of Mary (W) - LCMS (19th century)
9 Peter Claver, priest, missionary to Colombia, 1654 (Commemoration) – ELCA
10
11
12
13 John Chrysostom, Bishop of Constantinople, 407 (Commemoration) W – ELCA
14 Holy Cross Day (R)
15
16 Cyprian, Bishop of Carthage, martyr, c. 258 (Commemoration) R
17 Hildegard, Abbess of Bingen, 1179 (Commemoration) W – ELCA
18 Dag Hammarskjöld, renewer of society, 1961 (Commemoration) W – ELCA

19
20 Nelson Wesley Trout, bishop, 1996 (Commemoration) W – ELCA
21 Matthew, Apostle and Evangelist (R)
22 Maurice and Companions, Martyrs (R) - Historic
Jonah, prophet (Commemoration) R – LCMS
23
24
25
26
27
28
29 Michael and All Angels (W)
30 Jerome, translator, teacher, 420 (Commemoration) W

October
1
2
3
4 Francis of Assisi, renewer of the church, 1226 (Commemoration) W – ELCA
Theodor Fliedner, renewer of society, 1864 (Commemoration) W – ELCA
5
6 William Tyndale, translator, martyr, 1536 (Commemoration) R – ELCA
7 Henry Melchior Muhlenberg, pastor in North America, 1787 (Commemoration) W
8
9 Abraham, patriarch (Commemoration) W – LCMS
10 Massie L. Kennard, renewer of the church, 1996 (Commemoration) W – ELCA
11 Phillip, deacon (Commemoration) W – LCMS
12
13
14
15 Teresa of Ávila, teacher, renewer of the church, 1582 (Commemoration) W – ELCA
16
17 Ignatius, Bishop of Antioch, martyr, c. 115 (Commemoration) R
18 Luke, Evangelist(R)
19
20
21
22
23 James of Jerusalem, brother of Jesus and martyr, c. 62 (Lesser Festival) R

24
25 Lydia, Dorcas (Tabitha), and Phoebe, faithful women (Commemoration) – LCMS
26 Philipp Nicolai, 1608; Johann Heermann, 1647; Paul Gerhardt, 1676; hymnwriters (Commemoration) W
27
28 Simon and Jude, Apostles(R)
29
30
31 Reformation Day (Lesser Festival) R

November
1 All Saints' Day(W)
2 **Daniel Payne, teacher, 1893 (Commemoration) – ELCA
3 Martín de Porres, renewer of society, 1639 (Commemoration) W – ELCA
4
5 
6
7 John Christian Frederick Heyer, 1873; Bartholomaeus Ziegenbalg, 1719; Ludwig Ingwer Nommensen, 1918; missionaries (Commemoration) W – ELCA

8 Johann von Staupitz, priest, 1524 (Commemoration) W – LCMS
9 Martin Chemnitz, pastor and confessor, 1586 (Commemoration) W – LCMS
10
11 Martin of Tours, Bishop, 397 (W)
Søren Aabye Kierkegaard, teacher, 1855 (Commemoration) W – ELCA
12
13
14 Emperor Justinian, confessor, emperor of New Rome, 565 (Commemoration) W – LCMS
15
16
17 Elizabeth, renewer of society, 1231 (Commemoration) W – ELCA
18
19 Elizabeth of Hungary, 1231 (W) – LCMS
20
21
22
23 Clement, bishop of Rome, c. 100 (Commemoration) W
 Miguel Agustín Pro, priest, martyr, 1927 (Commemoration) R – ELCA
24 Justus Falckner, 1723; Jehu Jones, 1852; William Passavant, 1894; pastors in North America (Commemoration) W – ELCA
25 Catherine of Alexandria, Martyr (R) - historic
Isaac Watts, hymnwriter, 1748 (Commemoration) W – ELCA
26
27
28
29 Noah, prophet (Commemoration) R – LCMS
30 Andrew, Apostle (R)

December
1
2 Dorothy Kazel, Ita Ford, Maura Clarke and Jean Donovan, martyrs of El Salvador, 1980 (Commemoration) R - ELCA 
3 Francis Xavier, missionary to Asia, 1552 (Commemoration) W – ELCA
4 John of Damascus, theologian and hymnwriter, c. 749 (Commemoration) W
5
6 Nicholas, bishop of Myra, c. 342 (Commemoration) W
7 Ambrose, bishop of Milan, 397 (Commemoration) W
8
9
10
11
12

13 Lucy, martyr, 304 (Commemoration) R
14 John of the Cross, renewer of the church, 1591 (Commemoration) W – ELCA
15
16 
17 Daniel and the Three Young Men, prophets, (Commemoration) R – LCMS
18
19 Adam and Eve, patriarch and matriarch (Commemoration) W – LCMS
20 Katharina von Bora Luther, renewer of the church, 1552 (Commemoration) W
21 Thomas, Apostle(R) – LCMS
22
23
24 VIGIL OF THE NATIVITY OF OUR LORD (W)
25 NATIVITY OF OUR LORD (W)
26 Stephen, Deacon and Martyr (R)
27 John, Apostle and Evangelist (W)
28 The Holy Innocents, Martyrs (R)
29 Thomas of Canterbury, Martyr (R) - Historic
David, prophet (Commemoration) R – LCMS
30
31

See also

 Moveable feast
 List of saints
 Liturgical calendar (Lutheran)

References

Evangelical Lutheran Church in America. Evangelical Lutheran Worship - Final Draft. Augsburg Fortress Press, 2006.

Lutheran liturgy and worship
Lutheran
Evangelical Lutheran Church in America
Lutheran Church–Missouri Synod